Vachellia tortuosa, the twisted acacia , poponax or huisachillo, is a woody, leguminous thorn tree of the Caribbean, Florida, southern Texas, northeastern and central Mexico, and northern South America. It is found in tropical and desert habitats, such as the Rio Grande Valley, Central Mexican Plateau, and Colombian Tatacoa Desert.

Description
Stipular spines: may be fused at bases.
Leaves: compound, 4-8 pairs of segments, 15-20 pairs of leaflets; petiolar gland elliptic. 
Yellow flowers; stamens numerous.
Fruit: a slender moniliform, slightly curved.

References

External links

USDA Profile for Vachellia tortuosa (as Acacia tortuosa)

tortuosa
Flora of the Caribbean
Flora of Northeastern Mexico
Flora of Central Mexico
Flora of northern South America
Flora of Florida
Flora of Puerto Rico
Flora of the United States Virgin Islands
Flora of Cuba
Flora of Jamaica
Flora of Texas
Flora of Colombia
Flora of Venezuela
Trees of the United States
Flora without expected TNC conservation status